Morasha, Morashah (Hebrew: מורשה, Heritage) can refer to:
 the Morasha Israeli political party
 Musrara, Jerusalem, a neighborhood also known as Morasha
 Lauder – Morasha School, Warsaw, Poland
 a synagogue in Cape Town, South Africa
 a major interchange of Highway 4 and Highway 5 in central Israel